A step change produces a step response by controls

Step change may also refer to:

 a change in step on a step function
 a positional change from a stepper motor
 paradigm shift or step change; a dramatic change in circumstances
 StepChange, a British debt charity

See also

 change step

 Change (disambiguation)
 Step (disambiguation)